The State of the USA is a non-profit group that seeks to present non-partisan data on key national indicators of the United States.

The group works with the United States National Academy of Sciences in creating a federally mandated Key National Indicator System (KNIS).

See also
Economy of the United States

References

External links
Official Site

United States economic policy
Non-profit organizations based in the United States